John Combe of Great Bedwyn, Wiltshire, was an English politician.

He was a Member (MP) of the Parliament of England for Great Bedwyn in January 1380, February 1383, November 1384, 1386 and January 1390.

References

Year of birth missing
Year of death missing
English MPs January 1380
English MPs February 1383
English MPs November 1384
English MPs 1386
English MPs January 1390
14th-century English politicians
People from Wiltshire
Members of Parliament for Great Bedwyn